Tenzin is a Tibetan given name, meaning "the holder of Buddha Dharma". Tenzin can alternatively be spelled as Tenzing and Stanzin as well. Stanzin is generally used by the Ladakhi people, since Ladakhi language retains many archaic forms which have been lost in other modern Tibetan languages. For example, in Standard Written Tibetan, 'Tenzin' is spelled as "bstan'zin"; however, when it is spoken, both the 'b' and the 's' are silent and 'an' becomes 'en' in Standard Lhasa Tibetan. It may refer to any of the following people:

Biographical people
 Gyalsey Tenzin Rabgye (1638–1696), fourth Druk Desi (secular ruler) of Bhutan
 Khunu Lama Tenzin Gyaltsen (1895–1977), leader of a non-sectarian movement within Buddhism
 Lobsang Tenzin (born 1939), Prime Minister of the Tibetan government-in-exile
 Lopön Tenzin Namdak (born 1926), Tibetan religious leader
 Tenzin Choedrak (1922–2001), personal physician to the Dalai Lama
 Tenzin Delek Rinpoche (born 1950), Tibetan Buddhist leader accused of involvement in a bombing
 Tenzin Gyatso (born 1935), the 14th Dalai Lama
 Tenzin Jigme (1948–1997), abbot of an important Tibetan Buddhist monastery
 Tenzin Palmo (born 1943), Tibetan Buddhist nun, author, and yogini
 Tenzin Priyadarshi, Buddhist philosopher and teacher; Director, The Dalai Lama Center for Ethics and Transformative Values at MIT
 Tenzin Tsundue (born 1975), Tibetan poet and activist
 Tenzin Wangyal Rinpoche, Tibetan lama
 Tenzin Zopa (born 1975), Buddhist monk and teacher

Fictional characters
 Tenzin (Uncharted), fictitious leader of a Tibetan village
 Tenzin (The Legend of Korra), a character in the animation series The Legend of Korra
 Tenzing Tharkay (Temeraire series), a character in the novel series Temeraire by Naomi Novik
 Yakushiji Tenzen, a character in the novel The Kouga Ninja Scrolls

See also
Tenzing (name)

References

Tibetan names